Alopecia totalis is the loss of all hair on the head and face. Its causes are unclear, but believed to be autoimmune. Research suggests there may be a genetic component linked to developing alopecia totalis; the presence of DRB1*0401 and DQB1*0301, both of which are Human Leukocyte Antigens (HLA), were found to be associated with long-standing alopecia totalis.

Treatment
Methotrexate and corticosteroids are proposed treatments.

Scalp cooling has specifically been used to prevent alopecia in docetaxel chemotherapy, although it has been found prophylactic in other regimens as well. Treatment effects may take time to resolve, with one study showing breast cancer survivors wearing wigs up to 2 years after chemotherapy.

See also
Alopecia areata
Alopecia universalis

References

External links 

Conditions of the skin appendages
Human hair
Hair diseases